Ashton Durrand Sanders (born October 24, 1995) is an American actor best known for his portrayal of teenage Chiron in the Academy Award-winning film Moonlight (2016).

Early life 
Sanders was born in Carson, California. He attended Grand Arts High School in Downtown Los Angeles, from which he graduated in 2013. He was studying towards a BFA at The Theatre School at DePaul University, before leaving after three years in 2016 to focus on his acting career.

Career
Sanders made his film debut in The Retrieval, directed by Chris Eska. The film had its world premiere at South by Southwest on March 11, 2013. It was released in a limited release on April 2, 2014 by Variance Films.

In 2015, Sanders had a small role in Straight Outta Compton. In 2016, he appeared in an episode of Refinery29's web series The Skinny.

The same year, Sanders appeared in the drama film Moonlight, directed by Barry Jenkins. The film had its world premiere at the Telluride Film Festival on September 2, 2016, and began a limited release on October 21, 2016 by A24. Moonlight received massive critical acclaim as well dozens of accolades, including the Golden Globe Award for Best Picture – Drama. The film also won three Academy Awards for Best Picture, Best Adapted Screenplay, and Best Supporting Actor for Mahershala Ali. Sanders' role in the film was praised by critics; Benjamin Lee of The Guardian called his performance "powerful".

Sanders co-starred in The Equalizer 2, a sequel to the hit action film The Equalizer, opposite Denzel Washington. In 2019, Sanders starred in Rupert Wyatt's science fiction thriller film Captive State, opposite John Goodman and Vera Farmiga. He also played the lead in HBO's adaptation of the novel Native Son. In November 2020, he was set to star in The Things They Carried, a Vietnam war movie featuring an ensemble cast.

In September 2021, Sanders was cast as Bobby Brown in Whitney Houston: I Wanna Dance with Somebody, a biopic feature on Whitney Houston.

Filmography

Film

Television series

References

External links 
 

Living people
1995 births
21st-century American male actors
American male film actors
American male television actors
People from Carson, California
African-American male actors
Male actors from Los Angeles County, California
21st-century African-American people